The Hampton Park Football Club is an Australian rules football club which plays in the Southern FL Division 2.

History
Founding member of the South East Football Netball League they stayed three years before transferring to the Southern FNL in 2018.
The Redbacks played finals in their first season of SFNL, before winning the 2019 Division 3 premiership, defeating Clayton by 54 points.

Premierships
 South West Gippsland FL
 1959, 1960, 1963, 1967, 1968,
 Mornington Peninsula Nepean FL - Northern Division
 1997, 1998
 Southern Football Netball League 
 Division 3 - 2019

References

Australian rules football clubs in Melbourne
1958 establishments in Australia
Australian rules football clubs established in 1958
Sport in the City of Casey